USS Flagler (AK-181) was an  acquired by the U.S. Navy during the final months of World War II. She served the Pacific Ocean theatre of operations for a short period of time before being decommissioned at Okinawa and returned to the U.S. Maritime Administration for dispositioning.

Construction
Flagler was launched 24 March 1945 by Kaiser Cargo Co., Inc., Richmond, California, under a Maritime Commission contract, MC hull 2377; sponsored by Mrs. T. B. Smith; and commissioned 18 May 1945.

Service history

World War II-related service
Flagler sailed from San Francisco, California, 5 July 1945 with cargo for Ulithi and Leyte Gulf, where she discharged the last of her load 6 August. Here she loaded supplies and men for Okinawa, from which she sailed 29 August for Guam and Saipan.

Grounded during a typhoon
Okinawa-bound again 12 September, Flagler sailed through a raging typhoon Ursula, which caused some damage to the ship, but arrived safely 18 September. Twice while at Okinawa she put to sea to avoid typhoons, evading the firsttyphoon Jean. During the second, typhoon Louise, on 9 October, she was grounded. Success in a difficult salvage operation refloated her 26 October.

Decommissioning and disposal
Flagler was decommissioned at Okinawa 24 December 1945. She was returned to the Maritime Commission 29 March 1946 and laid up at Subic Bay. On 3 March 1948 she was sold for scrap to the Asia Development Corporation, Shanghai, China, along with 14 other vessels, for $271,000.

Notes 

Citations

Bibliography 

Online resources

External links

 

Alamosa-class cargo ships
Flagler County, Florida
Ships built in Richmond, California
1945 ships
World War II auxiliary ships of the United States